The PWS-101 was a high performance Polish glider first flown in 1937. One made the longest distance glider flight in Europe in 1938, gathering prizes for aircraft and pilot.

Design and development

Podlaska Wytwórnia Samolotów, generally known by its initials PWS, expanded into glider design and manufacture in 1936. Their first example, the PWS 101, was designed by Wacław Czerwiński who was a specialist glider designer, most recently of the 1934 CW 7 and CW 8. The PWS 101 was flown for the first time in the spring of 1937.

The single-seat PWS-101 was an all wood sailplane with a high aspect ratio, mid-mounted, gull wing. The inner 40% part of the span had a dihedral of about 8° but the remainder had little. In plan the wings were straight-tapered, mostly on the trailing edge. Its two parts were each built around a single spar which formed the rear of a plywood D-box including the leading edge. The innermost 25% of the span was further reinforced with ply covering and the rest of the surface was fabric-covered. Divided ailerons occupied more than half the trailing edges. A DFS type air brake, mounted on the spar at about one-third span, could be extended both above and below the wing.

Its fuselage was a ply-covered, oval section semi-monocoque structure with an enclosed, multi-transparency cockpit above the leading edges of the wing roots. Some of the production PWS-101s had  water ballast tanks. The fuselage tapered smoothly aft to a conventional empennage with a straight-tapered tailplane mounted on top and a curved fin, both ply-covered. The control surfaces were fabric-covered; the rudder was large and rounded and the elevators were semi-elliptical and assisted with inboard Flettner tabs. The PWS-101 landed on a sprung skid.

Operational history

After completing its flight trials In the early summer of 1937 two PWS-101s joined a Polish team competing at the annual Rhön glider  international contest, held in July on the Wasserkuppe. The Germans judged the PWS-101 the best foreign aircraft present and one set a new Polish distance record of  but they only achieved 10th and 20th places.

Production began shortly after the contest, with two series of five completed before the German invasion in September 1939. They did well in the national contests of 1937 and 1938 and two came first and second in the ISTUS International Contest held in Lwów in May 1939. It was named by the FAI as the supreme glider achievement of 1938 and Góra became the first recipient of the Lilienthal Medal. A PWS-101 was exhibited at the 1938 Paris Salon.

Specifications

See also
List of gliders

References

PWS aircraft
Aircraft first flown in 1937
1930s Polish sailplanes
Gull-wing aircraft